46 (forty-six) is the natural number following 45 and preceding 47.

In mathematics 

Forty-six is 

 a Wedderburn-Etherington number, 
 an enneagonal number 
 a centered triangular number.
 the number of parallelogram polyominoes with 6 cells.

It is the sum of the totient function for the first twelve integers. 46 is the largest even integer that cannot be expressed as a sum of two abundant numbers. It is also the sixteenth semiprime.

Since it is possible to find sequences of 46+1 consecutive integers such that each inner member shares a factor with either the first or the last member, 46 is an Erdős–Woods number.

In science 

 The atomic number of palladium.
 The number of human chromosomes.
 The approximate molar mass of ethanol (46.07 g mol)

Astronomy 

 Messier object M46, a magnitude 6.5 open cluster in the constellation Puppis.
 The New General Catalogue object NGC 46, a star in the constellation Pisces.

In music 
 Japanese idol group franchise Sakamichi Series, which consists of Nogizaka46, Keyakizaka46, Hinatazaka46, and Yoshimotozaka46

In sports 
 Valentino Rossi, one of the most successful motorcycle riders of all time, uses 46 as his number in the MotoGP motorcycle world championship, and has been using this number in homage to his father since he started racing as a youngster.
 The number of mountains in the 46 peaks of the Adirondack mountain range. People who have climbed all of them are called "forty-sixers"; there is also an unofficial 47th peak.
 The name of a defensive scheme used in American football; see 46 defense.

In religion 
 The total of books in the Old Testament, Catholic version, if the Book of Lamentations is counted as a book separate from the Book of Jeremiah

In other fields 

Forty-six is also:
 The code for international direct dial phone calls to Sweden.
 The number of samurai, out of 47, who carried out the attack in the historical Ako vendetta; sometimes referred to as the 46 Ronins to discount the one samurai forced to turn back.
 In the title of the movie Code 46, starring Tim Robbins and Samantha Morton.
 Several routes numbered 46 exist throughout the world.
 Because 46 in Japanese can be pronounced as "yon roku", and "yoroshiku"（よろしく） means "my best regards" in Japanese, people sometimes use 46 for greeting.
 46 is the number of the City Chevrolet and Superflo cars driven by Cole Trickle in the movie Days of Thunder.
 The number of the French department Lot.
 46 is the number that unlocks the Destiny spaceship on the Sci-Fi TV show Stargate Universe.  Dr. Rush discovers that the number 46 relates to the number of human chromosomes and begins sequencing different genetic codes to finally gain control of the ship's operating system.  The episode was called "Humans".
 The number depicted in the first flag of Oklahoma (replaced in 1925), signifying the fact that Oklahoma was the 46th state to join the United States.
Joe Biden was inaugurated as the 46th President of the United States on January 20, 2021.

See also
 List of highways numbered 46

References 

Integers